Dressler is a surname of German origin. Notable people with the surname include:
 Conrad Dressler (1856–1940), sculptor and potter
 Erich Dressler, luger
 Ernst Christoph Dressler (1734–1779), German composer, operatic tenor, violinist and music theorist
 Gallus Dressler (1533 – c. 1580/9), composer and music theorist
 Jim Dressler, politician
 Marie Dressler (1868–1934), actress
 Robert Dressler (disambiguation)
 Rudolf Dreßler (born 1940), politician and ambassador
 Sören Dreßler (born 1975), football player
 Weston Dressler (born 1985), football player
 William Dressler (disambiguation), several people
 Willy Oskar Dressler (1876–1954), German writer on art and interior decoration
 Wolfgang U. Dressler (born 1939), linguist

See also 
 Dressler's syndrome
 Drexler
 Martin Dressler: The Tale of an American Dreamer

German-language surnames